The women's competition in the light-heavyweight (– 69 kg) division was held on 21 and 22 September 2010.

Schedule

Medalists

Records

 Liu Chunhong's world records were rescinded in 2017.

Results

References
(Page 46) Start List
Results

- Women's 69 kg, 2010 World Weightlifting Championships
2010 in women's weightlifting